Kim Marie Johansson, is a Swedish convicted killer. In 2014 Johansson was sentenced to 14 years in prison for murdering and dismembering her ex girlfriend, Vatchareeya Bangsuan. The case, known as the Boden massacre, is considered the most serious in Norrbotten's criminal history.

Disappearance of Vatchareeya Bangsuan 
On 7 May 2013, Cattaliya Similä (born January 5, 1970) and her husband Hans Jan-Erik Similä (born July 20, 1966) reported their daughter Vatchareeya Bangsuan (born August 1, 1992) missing in Boden to the Luleå Police Department.

Two weeks later, body parts were found scattered in the forest.

Vatchareeya Bangsuan, from Boden, was studying to be a civil engineer at Luleå University of Technology, was about to get a driver's license, and was about to get a new karate belt the day after she disappeared. Kim Marie Johansson (born April 29, 1991), her girlfriend, participated in her search and pretended to be very worried.

Traces of blood were later found in the bathroom of Johansson's home and on the back door of her car. When she was sentenced by the district court to fourteen years in prison for murder, it was learned that she had also killed and dismembered her dog. Justice proved that Kim Marie Johansson had stabbed her girlfriend in Sweden in the heart and lungs with a knife-like object. She then must have cut up her body, dismembered her and hid parts of her body in several different places.

On May 20, Missing People found body parts in a desolate house in Mjösjöberget.
Body parts were found in an abandoned house in Mjösjöberget and surrounding areas, others in the woods of Gammelängsberget, but her hands were never found.

It was also learned that Johansson had killed and cut up her own dog. The body parts were found in the woods of Gammelängsberget.
The town was shocked and numerous popular demonstrations were held to demand the appearance of the young woman. The case is considered the most serious in Norrbotten's criminal history and had enormous media coverage in Sweden and Norway.
On May 23, 2013 she was arrested. At the age of 22 she was sentenced to 14 years in prison, although the sentence was later reduced to 10.  
On January 22, 2014 she was sentenced to prison for manslaughter, but on April 16, 2014 the Court of Appeals amended the sentence to 10 years for manslaughter.

Gender reassignment

In 2018, 27-year-old Johansson self-perceived herself as a woman and changed her name to Kim Marie Johansson.   According to Swedish law, no one could question it. She later applied for a transfer to a women's prison.   She was imprisoned in Norrtäljeanstalten, after the Court of Appeal reduced her sentence to ten years in prison despite the prison management considering her extremely violent.   Johansson was found guilty of repeated neglect and had 34 formal warnings for refusing to work, unauthorized possession of tablets, interest in weapons, war and explosives, personality functioning with lack of emotional resources, inflexible thought pattern, vulnerability to stress and difficulty in social interaction. She engaged in writing pornographic stories.

She applied to serve the remainder of her sentence in Hinseberg women's prison, which was granted after the Swedish Prison and Probation Service first rejected her.

The Swedish Prison and Probation Service approved her application to enter a women's prison and transferred her. At that time she was reported to the police for threatening to kill a prison guard.
She then opened an Instagram profile, as Magdala Johansson, from which she began to upload photos of "her artwork" (a drawing of dismembered female hands) and the rifle with which she plans to "kill the TERF" ("Kill the TERF" is a motto of transactivism), in reference to journalist Kajsa Ekis Ekman, who had written an article in the Swedish newspaper Aftonbladet, in which she criticized her sexual identity and the fact that she as a woman was transferred to a women's prison. Journalist Kajsa Ekis Ekman, was also threatened for saying that the trans law was dangerous for women, fears that she will be murdered on one of her furloughs.

Johansson claimed that she has actually been a girl since she was five years old, but that it took her several years to realize why she was the way she was and felt the way she felt. She said she would feel better in a women's prison as she was not comfortable around men and was scared. As a result, she moved from a Class 1 maximum security institution to a Class 2 lower security institution with women.
In 2020, Johansson was prosecuted for threatening Cissi Wallin.

Cinema
The documentary "In the Head of a Murderer - Kim Marie Johansson" on TV3 Dokumentär was made about her case.

References 

Living people
21st-century Swedish women
Norwegian assassins
People from Norrbotten County
2013 crimes in Sweden
1991 births